Asplundia clementinae is a species of plant in the Cyclanthaceae family. It is endemic to Ecuador.  Its natural habitat is subtropical or tropical moist lowland forests.

References

clementinae
Endemic flora of Ecuador
Critically endangered flora of South America
Taxonomy articles created by Polbot